Murray River National Park is a protected area  in South Australia located between  and  north east of the Adelaide city centre, lying along the Murray River.

The national park was proclaimed on 20 June 1991 under the National Parks and Wildlife Act 1972, "to conserve a significant proportion of South Australia’s floodplain environments which are not represented widely in other reserve systems".

The national park originally consisted of the first three sections listed below, with the following three in existence (six in total) . All of the sections adjoin the Murray River, extending from near Loxton in the south west to near Renmark in the north-east.
 Katarapko, on the north side of the river between Loxton in the south and Berri in the north
 Lyrup Flats, on the north side of the river midway between Berri and Loxton
 Bulyong, or Bulyong Island, on the west side of the river upstream from Renmark, accessible only by boat
 Paringa Paddock, including Goat Island, between Renmark and Paringa
 Gurra Gurra, just across the river south of Berri, directly opposite Katarapko
 Kingston-on-Murray, next to the township of  Kingston-on-Murray

Katarapko section includes the Ngak Indau Wetland trail, with a bird hide;and the Rilli Island, Media Island, and Kapunda Island Conservation Parks are also part of Katarapko.

The protected areas provide for a number recreational activities such as walking, bike riding, canoeing, bird-watching and bush camping. There are parking facilities, designated camping areas with some toilets, walking trails, and a self-guided drive trail.

See also
 Katarapko Game Reserve, historical game reserve on Katarapko Island
 List of islands within the Murray River in South Australia
 Protected areas of South Australia
 Riverland Biosphere Reserve
 Riverland Mallee Important Bird Area

References

External links
 Murray River National Park official site
Murray River National Park webpage on protected planet

National parks of South Australia
Protected areas established in 1991
1991 establishments in Australia
Murray River